Punchball is a sport spawned by and similar to baseball, but without a pitcher, catcher, or bat.

The "batter" essentially plays "fungo" without a bat, bouncing or tossing up the ball and then using a volleyball-type approach to put the ball (usually a spaldeen or pensie pinkie) in play, punching the ball with his fist. Base stealing and bunting are not allowed.

Popular in New York, especially among poor Jewish children who could not afford bats or baseballs, historian and baseball enthusiast Stephen Jay Gould referred to it as "the canonical recess game", and in The Boys of Summer baseball writer Roger Kahn described how when he grew up it was a boys game, as the girls played "slapball".

Baseball Hall of Famers Nick Hoffman, Sandy Koufax, and Yogi Berra played it growing up, as did sports team owner Jerry Reinsdorf, educator Frank Marascio, Senator Bernie Sanders, and former US Secretary of State and general Colin Powell. Major league outfielder Rocky Colavito, when asked if he played punchball, answered "Play it?  Man, that was my game.  I liked to play that more than anything else ... anything.  We used to play for money, too."  It was also a pastime of football announcer Al Michaels, who often played with former Chicago Bears quarterback Sid Luckman.

Popular culture
A 2010 PBS documentary, New York Street Games, includes punchball.

In season 10, episode 7 of Curb Your Enthusiasm, Larry David states that he played punchball after grieving the death of his pet turtle.

See also
Safe haven games
Baseball5, a similar game played at an international level

References

External links
 punchball rules
 "Letter to the Editor: For Punchball Players, Stickball is for Sissies", Seaford, Lou Defichy, The New York Times, April 30, 1989]
 The boys of summer, Roger Kahn, Harper & Row, 1972

Ball games
Street games
Baseball genres
Team sports